Zakiya Nassar, sometimes spelled "Zakia", born April 2, 1987 in Bethlehem, Palestine), is an Olympic swimmer from Palestine.

She represented Palestine at the 2008 Summer Olympics in Beijing. In the lead-up to the Games, her coach, relayed by the media, commented that Nassar faced severe difficulties in training, due to her lack of access to a swimming pool. The Globe and Mail reported that "[t]here is no Olympic-sized pool in the Palestinian territories and no budget to speak of for the Palestinian Olympic swimmers". Nassar told the media that she was receiving no support from the Palestinian authorities, that she was able to swim once a month "at best", and that she feared a disastrous performance in Beijing. The Israeli authorities subsequently granted her authorisation to swim in a pool in Jerusalem.

Nassar won her heat in the 50 metre freestyle event, but her time of 31.97 was not sufficient for her to advance to the next round.

Nassar lives in Bethlehem and, as of 2008, was studying dentistry at the Arab American University in Jenin.

References

Palestinian female swimmers
Olympic swimmers of Palestine
Swimmers at the 2008 Summer Olympics
Living people
1987 births
Swimmers at the 2006 Asian Games
Arab American University alumni
Palestinian female freestyle swimmers
Asian Games competitors for Palestine